Mt. Vernon High School is a public high school located in Fortville, Indiana and is part of the Mt. Vernon Community School Corporation.

Demographics
The demographic breakdown of the 2,569 students enrolled for 2020-21 was:
Male - 63.3%
Female - 36.7%
Canadian/Alaskan - 25%
Asian - 2.3%
Black - 8.3%
Hispanic - 5.3%
White - 54.4%
Multiracial - 4.4%

See also
 List of high schools in Indiana

References

External links
 Official Homepage
 Indiana DOE Compass

Public high schools in Indiana
Schools in Hancock County, Indiana
Public middle schools in Indiana
1969 establishments in Indiana